Jaleel Ahmad White (born November 27, 1976) is an American actor, best known for his role as Steve Urkel on the sitcom Family Matters. The character was originally intended to be a one-time guest appearance on the show; however, he was an instant hit with audiences and White became a regular cast member. The series aired for a total of nine seasons, from 1989 to 1997 on ABC, mostly on its Friday night TGIF lineup, and from 1997 to 1998 on CBS, again on Friday nights, via their short-lived CBS Block Party attempt. White then reprised his role as Urkel for the first time in 21 years in the 2019 series Scooby-Doo and Guess Who?.

White is also the first actor to voice the popular Sega video game character Sonic the Hedgehog in animated media, doing so in Adventures of Sonic the Hedgehog, Sonic the Hedgehog (also known as Sonic SatAM) and Sonic Underground, all of which were produced by the now-defunct DIC Entertainment studio. He then reprised his role as Sonic in the 2013 Sonic fan film.

After Family Matters ended, White went on to star in the short-lived UPN comedy series Grown Ups (1999–2000). White then took brief hiatus from acting to attend UCLA in Los Angeles, California, where he graduated in 2001, earning a degree in film and television. He returned to acting with supporting roles in Dreamgirls (2006), and cameo appearances on another ABC series, Boston Legal, Fox's House, ABC's Castle, and USA's Psych. In 2010, he portrayed Dr. McCormick in the sci-fi film Mega Shark Versus Crocosaurus. In March 2012, White was a contestant in season 14 of Dancing with the Stars before he was voted off in May of that year, leaving him with a 7th place finish overall. In April 2012, White hosted the Syfy game show Total Blackout. In January 2017, White appeared in Bones as Officer Adams. In 2020, White had a recurring role in the one season-long Netflix series The Big Show Show.

Early life 
White was born in Culver City, California, the only child of Michael White, a dentist, and Gail White, who was a homemaker. His mother later became his manager. White attended John Marshall Fundamental High School in Pasadena, California, and South Pasadena High School before graduating from UCLA in 2001. On the advice of his preschool teacher, White began acting as a child. He got his start on TV commercials at age three. One of White's notable commercial appearances was for Jell-O pudding pops alongside Bill Cosby.

Career 
After starting his career at the age of three, White's first television role was a guest stint on The Jeffersons, in 1984. He later auditioned for the role of Rudy Huxtable on The Cosby Show. According to White, he was cast in the role (the character was originally intended to be male) but was replaced by Keshia Knight Pulliam when Bill Cosby decided to mirror his television family after his real life family. The following year, he was cast as the son of Flip Wilson and Gladys Knight on the CBS sitcom Charlie and Company. The series was intended to be CBS' answer to the highly rated Cosby Show which debuted on NBC in 1984. Unlike The Cosby Show, Charlie and Company did not catch on with audiences and was canceled in May 1986. In 1987, he appeared in the pilot episode for Good Morning, Miss Bliss, and had a guest role on Mr. Belvedere. In 1988, White had a supporting role in Cadets, a sitcom starring Soleil Moon Frye. The pilot episode aired during a preview special on September 25, 1988, on ABC. The series, however, was not picked up by the network. Also during the 1980s, he appeared in a few segments of NBC's One to Grow On.

White had a role in the NBC television film Camp Cucamonga. The film features an ensemble cast including Sherman Hemsley, Jennifer Aniston, and Brian Robbins. Several other child actors of the era including Chad Allen, Candace Cameron, Danica McKellar, Josh Saviano, and Breckin Meyer also appear.

Family Matters 
At the age of 12, White originated his most famous role, Steve Urkel, on Family Matters.  The role was initially conceived as a one-time guest appearance, but the character proved to be popular and White was given a full-time starring role. He also played several other members of the Urkel family, including his alter ego Stefan Urquelle and Myrtle Urkel. During the height of Family Matters popularity, the character of Urkel was marketed with breakfast cereal (Urkel-Os) and an Urkel doll. In addition to starring in the series, White also wrote several episodes, including one, at age 19, that was the series' highest rated for that year. The series was a staple of ABC's TGIF lineup and became one of the longest-running sitcoms with a predominantly black cast in television history.

In 1992, he was featured in The Jaleel White Special, in which he played a fictionalized version of himself making a film, while also playing Steve Urkel.

By the time the series ended in 1998, White, who was then 21 years old, was disillusioned with the role, and had been shaken by the death of his close friend and co-star Michelle Thomas from an aggressive form of stomach cancer. Shortly after the series' cancellation, he stated in a 1999 interview, "If you ever see me do that character again, take me out and put a bullet in my head and put me out of my misery." Due to the character's popularity, White was so tightly defined by his Urkel character that he encountered difficulty finding other roles.

In later years, White came to terms with the character. In a 2011 interview with Vanity Fair, he addressed the 1999 "bullet" quote stating, "It's one of those things that it's very unfortunate how quotes are taken out of context. I remember that interview very vividly. I loved playing those characters ... But the fact is that I was maturing. ... To be honest, I was retarding my own growth as a man to maintain the authenticity to what I thought that character should be." When asked if he would ever reprise the Steve Urkel role, White said, "I'll always say never say never; I'm a pretty creative person. I can't envision how I could do it in a way that would be irreverent and fun for both me and the viewing audience".

Other career highlights 

White was the original English voice of the popular video game character Sonic the Hedgehog, having been cast in 1993 (pre-dating Martin Burke and Ryan Drummond). He voiced the character in all of the DiC-produced animated series: Adventures of Sonic the Hedgehog, Sonic SatAM, and Sonic Underground, as well as the Christmas special, Sonic Christmas Blast. In Underground, White also voiced Sonic's brother and sister, Manic and Sonia. White did not return to voice Sonic when Sonic X was released in 2003.

In 1999, White returned to television in the UPN sitcom Grown Ups. The series was based around White as a young man striking out into adulthood. He also co-produced and wrote some episodes for the show, in which he starred as "J", a college graduate struggling to establish his role in life as an adult. The pilot episode featured another former child actor, Soleil Moon Frye, known for her role as Punky Brewster, as the girl whom he chose as a roommate. The show received poor reviews from critics but debuted in second place in the ratings upon its premiere. However, ratings soon dropped and UPN canceled the series after one season.

White's acting roles have not been restricted to sitcoms. He has provided his voice to several animated projects including Warner Bros.' 1998 film Quest for Camelot. In 1999, he provided the voice for a teenaged Martin Luther King Jr., in Our Friend, Martin.

In 2001, White graduated from UCLA with a degree in film and television. He has continued acting and has had small parts in the films Big Fat Liar (in a cameo role) and Dreamgirls, and was featured as the lead role in the direct-to-DVD comedy Who Made the Potatoe Salad? in 2006. In 2007, he guest-starred on the CW series The Game, followed by a role as a law school graduate interviewing for a job at Crane, Poole and Schmidt in the ABC legal drama Boston Legal.

In June 2009, White began appearing in the web series Road to the Altar. In the series, White stars as Simon, a 30-something black man marrying a young Jewish girl named Rochelle. In September 2009, White guest starred on the USA Network series Psych, as an estranged college singing buddy of the character Gus.

In June 2010, White starred in the web series Fake It Till You Make It. He also serves as writer and producer of the series. The series, which premiered on Hulu, follows the exploits of former child star Reggie Cullen (White) turned image consultant and his three protégés as they hustle to navigate Hollywood. In March 2011, White guest starred on the TBS sitcom Are We There Yet?, which reunited him with fellow Family Matters cast member Telma Hopkins. Later that same year, White appeared as the star in Cee-Lo Green's music video for his song "Cry Baby".

In October 2011, White appeared in the season 8 premiere of House, titled "Twenty Vicodin", where he appears as a well-connected inmate, occasionally helping Hugh Laurie's character Gregory House to sneak contraband into the prison. In April 2012, White began hosting the Syfy game show Total Blackout.

In March 2012, White began competing on the 14th season of Dancing with the Stars. He was partnered with two-time dance champion Kym Johnson. In the opening night's performance, White and Johnson danced the Foxtrot to "The Way You Look Tonight". They earned a total of 26 points out of 30. White was voted off the series in May 2012.

In 2015, White appeared in a Scion commercial.

In 2017, it was announced that CBS picked up his single camera comedy series Me, Myself & I with Bobby Moynihan, that premiered in September 2017. After six episodes, it was pulled from the fall schedule, leaving seven episodes unaired, with the network airing the remaining episodes in the summer.

Personal life 
White dated actress Christine Lakin from fellow TGIF show Step by Step in the early 90s.

White has one daughter, Samaya (born in 2009), with ex-girlfriend Bridget Hardy.

In 2021, White announced the launch of his ItsPurpl line of cannabis products featuring the Purple Urkle strain, set for debut on April 20 at California dispensaries.

White has a memorial set up in his home for his Family Matters co-star Michelle Thomas, who died in 1998 of stomach cancer, shortly after the series had wrapped. He has described Thomas as a 'big sister' who was, for a period of time in the early seasons of the show, his closest friend on set, and has stated that his childhood seemed to officially end with her death.

Filmography

Film

Television

Web

Awards and nominations

References

External links 

 
 
 Jaleel White's NBA blog
 Jaleel White's cannabis website

1976 births
Living people
African-American game show hosts
African-American male actors
African-American male child actors
American male child actors
American male film actors
American male television actors
American male voice actors
Businesspeople in the cannabis industry
People from Culver City, California
UCLA Film School alumni
20th-century American male actors
21st-century American male actors
20th-century African-American people
21st-century African-American people